Father Juan Vélez (12 March 1602 – 1661) was a Roman Catholic prelate who was appointed Bishop of Cebu.

Biography
Juan Vélez was born in Córdoba, Spain and ordained a priest in 1627. He served as dean of the church in the Archdiocese of Manila. On 26 January 1660 Pope Alexander VII appointed him Bishop of Cebu. Although he assumed the position as Bishop of Cebu, he died before his consecration as bishop.

References

External links and additional sources
 (for Chronology of Bishops) 
 (for Chronology of Bishops) 

1602 births
1661 deaths
Bishops appointed by Pope Alexander VII
Roman Catholic bishops of Cebu